Shah Sharaf (1640–1724) is a famous Punjabi Sufi Poet who wrote his work in Kafi style. He also wrote Dohras, and Shuturnama. Among the people whom his poetry influenced Bulleh Shah is the most popular.

See also
 Baba Bulleh Shah
Punjabi language
Punjabi people
List of Punjabi language poets

References

Punjabi-language poets
1724 deaths
1640 births